Besant Hill School of Happy Valley, formerly the Happy Valley School, is an American private, coeducational boarding school and day school in Ojai, California. The school has approximately 100 students and about 35 faculty and staff, all of whom live on or near campus. In the 2017/18 school year there are 13 states and 22 countries represented in the student body. An environmental science and sustainability program is coupled with a working garden/farm on campus.

History
An educational community was envisioned by Annie Besant, which later took the form of a secondary school that was founded by Guido Ferrando, Aldous Huxley, J. Krishnamurti, and Rosalind Rajagopal. It opened on October 1, 1946 as the Happy Valley School with Dr. Ferrando serving as the first Head of School. The school was later renamed in July 2007 in Besant's honor.

Notable founders/faculty members
Annie Besant – Main Founder of the school, women's rights activist and president of the theosophical society
Rosalind Rajagopal – Main Founder of the school and long-time director.
Aldous Huxley – Main Founder of the school and author/novelist
Jiddu Krishnamurti – An Indian speaker and writer on philosophical and spiritual subjects
Franklin Lacey – Faculty member and Head of School, playwright and screenwriter
Beatrice Wood – Faculty member and Avante garde artist and studio potter

Notable alumni

William B. Kaplan, award-winning American audio engineer
Alex J. Mandl
Tom Pollock
Cheryl Crane

References

External links
 Official website
 Happy Valley Foundation

High schools in Ventura County, California
Boarding schools in California
Ojai, California
Private high schools in California
1946 establishments in California
Educational institutions established in 1946
Monuments and memorials to Annie Besant